Anne Hume "Nancy" Livingston (born Shippen) (24 February 1763 – 25 August 1841) was an American journal writer.

Early life
Shippen was born on 24 February 1763 in Shippen House in Shippensburg. She was a daughter of William Shippen Jr. (1736–1808) and Alice (née Lee) Shippen (1736–1817), a daughter of Thomas Lee and Hannah Harrison Ludwell.

Shippen House was built by her grandfather William Shippen Sr. and although it is now a large house at that time it was 28 feet by 30 feet. She was brought up there when she wasn't being educated at Mrs Rogers's school in Trenton, New Jersey. In 1796 she was painted by Benjamin Trott.

Personal life
Shippen was romanced by the French diplomat Louis-Guillaume Otto, but her father decided that he would marry her to Colonel Henry Beekman Livingston in 1781. 
Her husband commanded the 4th New York Regiment at the Battles of Saratoga and Monmouth and during the winter at Valley Forge. He was the son of Robert Livingston (1718–1775) and great-grandson of Robert Livingston the Elder, 1st Lord of Livingston Manor.

She gave birth the same year to Margaret Beekman "Peggy" Livingston (1781–1864). The marriage was not a success and Anne returned to Shippen House where she started a journal in 1783. This is the reason that she is remembered as it gives an insight into her social life and later her thwarted attempts to obtain a divorce. She had to live with her parents and her daughter went to live with the estranged husband's mother.

Shippen died in Philadelphia in 1841 whilst living with her daughter.

References

External links

1763 births
1841 deaths
People from Shippensburg, Pennsylvania
Shippen family
American writers